Luca Guercilena (born 4 August 1973 in Cassinetta di Lugagnano) is the general manager for men's UCI WorldTeam , and UCI Women's WorldTeam .

Guercilena was one of the leading parties in the 2020 suspension of rider Quinn Simmons for making provocative tweets.

References

External links
Mémoire du cyclisme

1973 births
Living people
Italian sports directors
Sportspeople from the Metropolitan City of Milan